Second Half is a 2007 Norwegian comedy film directed by Hilde Heier, starring Johannes Joner, Espen Reboli Bjerke and Baard Owe. The two brothers Erik (Bjerke) and Sverre (Joner) are both experiencing relationship problems, while their father (Owe) has to place his wife in a retirement home after she develops Alzheimer. Every Sunday the three meet to watch their favourite club, Skeid, play football. However, there is fear that they may get relegated this year.

External links 
 
 Andre omgang at Filmweb.no (Norwegian)
 Second Half at the Norwegian Film Institute

2007 films
2007 comedy films
Norwegian comedy films
2000s Norwegian-language films